Mount Luofu is a sacred Taoist mountain situated on the north bank of the Dongjiang in the northwest of Boluo County, Huizhou in Guangdong Province, China. It covers 250 kilometers.

Among the many temples on Mt. Luofu is Wa Sau Toi, which is linked to both the Dragon and Bak Mei styles of Kung Fu.

The Mok Gar master Lin Yin-Tang studied meditation and traditional Chinese medicine at the Temple of Emptiness on Mt. Luofu.

Choy Fook, one of the teachers of Choy Lee Fut founder Chan Heung, is said to have been a monk on Mt. Luofu.

In the Eastern Jin dynasty, the renowned Taoist practitioner Ge Hong once refined elixirs here. During Ge Hong's stay on Mt. Luofu, four huts were built, and subsequently enlarged into temples, namely the southern Temple of Great Emptiness (which was changed into the Temple of Emptiness afterwards), the western Temple of the Yellow Dragon, the eastern Temple of the Nine Heavens, and the northern Temple of Junkets.

In the Qing dynasty, a branch of the Dragon Gate Sect propagated its teachings at the Temple of Junkets. During the reign of the Guangxu Emperor, the abbot of the temple, Chen Jiaoyou, wrote Evolution of the Taoism of  Master Changchun's Lineage, an important work on the history of transmission and inheritance of the Dragon Gate Sect.

It was said that there were nine guan (Taoist temples), 18 si (Buddhist monasteries) and 22 an (nunneries) on Mt. Luofu, but after the Ming and Qing dynasties, many of them collapsed and only five guan and five si remain nowadays. The five remaining Taoist temples are the Temple of Emptiness, the Temple of Junkets, the Temple of the Nine Heavens, the Temple of the White Crane, and the Temple of the Yellow Dragon. The Temple of Emptiness is one of the national key temples acknowledged by the State Council.

There are many relics of Ge Hong on Mt. Luofu, such as the "Well of Longevity" from which he obtained water, the alchemical kitchen for refining elixirs, and the pond for washing elixirs. The Grotto of Vermillion Brightness on the mountain is said to be the place where Ge Hong cultivated Tao and attained immortality. It is situated in the forest in the deep valley below Mt. Luofu, where everything is in deep stillness, except for gurgling streams.

Besides, there is a "Boots-Losing House", which is said to be the place where Ge Hong and his teacher Bo Jing used to discuss scriptures. One day, after talking until daybreak, two swallows flew toward them. However, they turned out to be a pair of boots instead of swallows, after being entangled. There is a stone tablet above the house. It is about five-chi long, half-chi wide and one-chi high. It lies against a huge stone like a bed and is completely in the shade.

See also 
 Pan Zhang & Wang Zhongxian
 Sacred Mountains of China
 Taoism
 Ge Hong
 Wa Sau Toi

Notes 
 Temple of Emptiness
 Dragon Gate Sect

External links
 Mt. Luofu at The Daoist Encyclopedia 

Luofu
Loufu
Huizhou
Tourist attractions in Guangdong